Bustan (also Romanized as Būstān) is a village in Kiskan Rural District, in the Central District of Baft County, Kerman Province, Iran. At the 2006 census, its population was 28, in 12 families.

References 

Populated places in Baft County